Pseudomonas septica is a Gram-negative, rod-shaped, non-spore-forming, bacterium that is pathogenic to insects. It was first isolated on the weevil Xyloterus lineatus. The type strain is ATCC 14545.

Pseudomonadales
Bacteria described in 1930